The 1951 Arkansas State Indians football team was an American football team that represented Arkansas State College—now known as Arkansas State University—as an independent during the 1951 college football season. Led by sixth-year head coach Forrest England, the Indians compiled a record of 10–2. They were invited to the Refrigerator Bowl, where they beat Camp Breckinridge, and the Tangerine Bowl, where they lost to Stetson.

Schedule

References

Arkansas State
Arkansas State Red Wolves football seasons
Arkansas State Indians football